Cincinnatus may refer to:

People
 A number of ancient Romans named Cincinnatus; see Quinctii Cincinnati, especially:
 The Roman patriot Lucius Quinctius Cincinnatus (consul 460 BC)
Cincinnatus was a handle the NSA whistleblower Edward Snowden used online
Cincinnatus Miller (1837–1913), American poet and frontiersman

Fictional characters
 Cincinnatus, an innkeeper played by Dallas McKennon on the 1964-70 TV series Daniel Boone
 Cincinnatus C., the protagonist of the Vladimir Nabokov novel Invitation to a Beheading

Organizations
Society of the Cincinnati, a patriotic society founded by soldiers of the American Revolution, based on the ideals of Cincinnatus
New Order of Cincinnatus, political organization founded in Seattle  in the 1930s
Cincinnatus Honorary Society, a honorary organization founded at the University of Cincinnati

Places
Cincinnatus, New York

Other
Cincinnatus (mural), a public mural in Cincinnati, Ohio, United States

See also 
 Cincinnati (disambiguation)
 Cincinnato (disambiguation)